Yushan Lu Station is a station of Line 1, Suzhou Rail Transit. The station is located in Suzhou New District of Suzhou. It has been in use since April 28, 2012, the same time of the operation of Line 1.

Station

Accessible Information
Yushan Lu Station is a fully accessible station, this station equipped with wheelchair accessible elevators, blind paths with bumps, and wheelchair ramps. These facilities can help people with disabilities, seniors, youths, and pregnancies travel through Suzhou Rail Transit system.

Station configurations
L1 (First Floor/Street Level): Entrances/Exits (stairs and escalators); and elevators with wheelchair accessible ramps.

B1 (Mezzanine/Station Hall Level): Station Control Room; Customer Service; Automatic Ticket Vending Machines; Automatic Fee Collection Systems with turnstiles; stairs and escalators; and elevators with wheelchair accessible ramps.

B2 (Platform Level): Platform; toilet; stairs and escalators; elevators with wheelchair accessible ramps.

Station layout

First & Last Trains

Exits Information
Exit 1: West side of Changjiang Lu, inside of Matro Department Store SND Mall

Exit 2: West side of Changjiang Lu

Exit 3b: East side of Changjiang Lu

Exit 3b: West side of Changjiang Lu

Exit 4: West side of Changjiang Lu, inside of Izumiya Department Store & Supermarket

Local Attractions
Yushan Park
Matro Department Store SND mall
Izumiya Department Store & Supermarket
Suzhou Amusement Land Water World
Suzhou Amusement Land Candy World
JinYi Cinema
XinTai Garden

Bus Connections
Bus Stop: YuShan GongYuan - Connection Bus Routes: Tour 3, 38, 39, 89, 317, 511

Bus Stop: XinTaiHuaYuan XiChuKou - Connection Bus Routes: 2, 33, 67, 302, 312, 329

References

Railway stations in Jiangsu
Suzhou Rail Transit stations
Railway stations in China opened in 2012